Simonson is a surname. Notable people with the surname include:

Albert Simonson (1914–1965), American chess master
Alexis Simonson, Belgian Olympic fencer
Dave Simonson (born 1952), former professional American football player
Des Simonson, former New Zealand rower
Eric Simonson (born 1960), American writer and director in theatre, film and opera
Itamar Simonson, professor of consumer psychology, decision making, market research, and marketing management
Joy Simonson (1919–2007), women's rights and progressive activist
Lee Simonson (1888–1967), American architect painter, stage setting designer
Louise Simonson (born 1946), American comic book writer and editor
Martin Simonson, Swedish scholar, novelist, and translator, specialized in fantastic literature and nature writing
Michael R. Simonson Ph.D. is a professor of Instructional Technology & Distance Education at Nova Southeastern University
Stewart Simonson, the first Assistant Secretary for Public Health Emergency Preparedness at the US Department of Health and Human Services
Susan Raab Simonson (1969–2006), American stage actress and theatre producer
Walt Simonson (born 1946), American comic book writer and artist

See also
Simonson, Virginia, unincorporated community in Richmond County, in the U.S. state of Virginia
Simonson Brook (New Jersey), also known as Sunonson Brook, is a tributary of the Millstone River

Surnames from given names